Vanzina is a surname. Notable people with the surname include:

Carlo Vanzina (born 1951), Italian film director, producer, and screenwriter, son of Stefano
Stefano Vanzina (1915–1988), Italian film director, screenwriter, and cinematographer